Asuman Güven Aksoy is a Turkish-American mathematician whose research concerns topics in functional analysis, metric geometry, and operator theory including Banach spaces, measures of non-compactness, fixed points, Birnbaum–Orlicz spaces, real trees, injective metric spaces, and tight spans. She works at Claremont McKenna College, where she is Crown Professor of Mathematics and George R. Roberts Fellow.

Education
Aksoy studied mathematics and physics at Ankara University, graduating with a bachelor's degree in 1976. She earned a master's degree in mathematics at Middle East Technical University in 1978, with a thesis Subspaces of Nuclear Fréchet Spaces supervised by Tosun Terzioğlu.
She moved to the United States in 1978 for additional graduate study at the University of Michigan, and eventually became a US citizen. She completed her doctorate at the University of Michigan in 1984. Her dissertation, Approximation Schemes, Related -Numbers, and Applications, was supervised by Melapalayam S. Ramanujan.

Career
After completing her doctorate, Aksoy joined the faculty of Oakland University in 1984, and was tenured there in 1987. She moved to Claremont McKenna in 1990, and chaired the mathematics department there from 1997 to 2000 and again from 2007 to 2009. She was given the Crown Professorship and Roberts Fellowship in 2009.

Books
With Mohamed Amine Khamsi, Aksoy is the author of two books:
 Nonstandard Methods in Fixed Point Theory (Universitext, Springer, 1990)
 A Problem Book in Real Analysis (Springer, 2009)

Recognition
In 2006 the Southern California–Nevada Section of the Mathematical Association of America gave Aksoy their annual Award for Distinguished College or University Teaching of Mathematics.

References

External links
 
 

Year of birth missing (living people)
Living people
20th-century American mathematicians
21st-century American mathematicians
American people of Turkish descent
American women mathematicians
Turkish mathematicians
Functional analysts
Ankara University alumni
Middle East Technical University alumni
Oakland University faculty
Claremont McKenna College faculty
University of Michigan alumni
20th-century American women
21st-century American women